Brdinje is a dispersed settlement in the hills southeast of Ravne na Koroškem in the Carinthia region in northern Slovenia.

References

External links
Brdinje on Geopedia

Populated places in the Municipality of Ravne na Koroškem